Brocchinia cowanii is a species of plant in the genus Brocchinia. This species is endemic to the Amazonas region of southern Venezuela.

References

cowanii
Endemic flora of Venezuela
Plants described in 1957